Clinique Laboratories, LLC is an American manufacturer of skincare, cosmetics, toiletries and fragrances, usually sold in high-end department stores. It is a subsidiary of the Estée Lauder Companies. As of 2019, Clinique has over 22,000 customer consultants worldwide.

History

In 1967, American Vogue magazine published an article called "Can Great Skin Be Created?", written by beauty editor Carol Phillips with Norman Orentreich, discussing the significance of a skin-care routine. Evelyn Lauder, daughter-in-law of Estée Lauder, read the article and brought it to Estée's attention. Both Carol Phillips and Orentreich were recruited to help create the brand, and in April 1968, Clinique premiered as the world's first allergy tested, dermatologist-driven line at Saks Fifth Avenue in the New York, US, launched with 117 products.

Evelyn Lauder, an executive at Estée Lauder and member of the Lauder family, created the Clinique brand name and developed its line of products. Lauder worked as the training director for Clinique. She was the first person to wear the trademark white lab coat, now worn by Clinique Consultants worldwide.

Clinique was the third brand that was "born" from the Lauder Group after Estée Lauder and Aramis.

In 2008, Clinique announced a partnership with Allergan, the maker of Botox and former cosmeceutical partner of Elizabeth Arden, with the result being a new line called Clinique Medical. The line is only available in physician's offices. The five-product set is designed for pre- and post-operation skin care, and targets complications such as redness, tightness, burning, irritation, discoloration, among others that "slow the healing process." In 2022, Clinique launched in the Metaverse and released a new NFT campaign.

Awards
In 2019, Clinique was "awarded Best Ecommerce Experience at the inaugural Glossy Awards Europe."

In 2020, Clinique publicly announced British actress Emilia Clarke as their first Global Ambassador.

References

External links

Clinique's Official International Website

Cosmetics brands
Cosmetics companies of the United States
American companies established in 1968
History of cosmetics
Estée Lauder Companies brands